"The Cautionary Tale of Numero Cinco" is episode 6 of season 5 in the television show Angel. Written and directed by Jeffrey Bell, it was originally broadcast on  November 5, 2003 on the WB network.

Plot
On the Mexican Day of the Dead, Angel has a run-in with a masked Wolfram & Hart employee. He is connected to an Aztec warrior demon named Tezcatcatl, who preys on the hearts of heroes.  This leads Angel to wrestle with some personal issues when he learns about 'Los Hermanos Numeros', a family of five Mexican luchadores who helped the helpless until one day four were slain by Tezcatcatl. Angel helps the last member 'Number Five', the aforementioned employee, to discover the hero inside, which he lost when his family were killed. Angel, Five and his four brothers, temporarily back from the dead, battle and kill the demon. This leads to the death of Number Five, who is escorted into the afterlife by his brothers.

Meanwhile, Spike researches the Shanshu Prophecy about a vampire becoming human and thinks that he, not Angel, may be the vampire who will become human.

Production
Writer/director Jeffrey Bell explains that he always wanted to work Mexican wrestling into one of his The X-Files scripts, but it wasn't until he pitched the idea to creator Joss Whedon that he was able to realize his "lifelong dream - to tell a story about Mexican wrestlers." The inspiration for the episode came partly from the real life Mexican wrestler Santo whose career included film roles as masked "luchador" fighting vampires and other supernatural foes, one of whose films was used in the Mystery Science Theater 3000 episode "Samson vs. the Vampire Women".

When Number Five is in the bar and Holland Manners holds out a Wolfram & Hart business card, there is a grammatical error on the multi-dimensional law-firm's calling card.  It reads 'Attorney's at Law' as opposed to 'Attorneys at Law.'

The Wilhelm scream can be heard approximately one minute into the episode.

Continuity
In the non-canonical comic Spike: Old Wounds, Spike reveals that he actually met Los Hermanos Numeros in 1947, and chose not to tell the others.
While explaining why he no longer believes in the Shanshu prophecy, Angel mentions the fake prophecy made by Sahjhan that caused Wesley to betray Angel Investigations in season 3. Due to having his memory altered in the fourth season finale, Wesley doesn't understand what Angel is talking about.
Number Five can be seen in several previous episodes but this is the first time he has any dialogue. This episode also marks Number Five's last appearance.
When Number Five is approached by a Wolfram & Hart employee at the bar after his brothers' deaths the business card shows that the employee is actually Holland Manners.
When Angel visited Number Five at his home, he never invited Angel into his home before grabbing Angel and throwing him against the wall inside his kitchen.

References

External links

 

2003 American television episodes
Angel (season 5) episodes
Lucha libre
Day of the Dead television episodes